Dumak Rural District is a rural district (dehestan) in Nosratabad District, Zahedan County, Sistan and Baluchestan province, Iran. At the 2006 census, its population was 6,746, in 1,286 families. At the 2016 census, its population was 5,437.

References 

Zahedan County
Rural Districts of Sistan and Baluchestan Province
Populated places in Zahedan County